Helen Benedict is an American novelist and journalist, best known for her writings on social injustice, the Iraq War and most recently, refugees.

Biography
Benedict was born in London, England, to parents Burton Benedict and Marion Steuber Benedict who were American anthropologists. As a child, she lived in Mauritius and Seychelles, where her parents conducted fieldwork. Seychelles became the setting for Benedict's novel, The Edge of Eden. Her background as a child of anthropologists has informed her work both as a novelist and a journalist.

Benedict grew up partly in London, partly in California, and attended university in both England and the United States. She worked for newspapers in both countries, and obtained her master's degree from the University of California, Berkeley, in 1979. She first began to publish in the United States that year and into the 1980s, with profiles of Nobel Laureate Isaac Bashevis Singer, Susan Sontag and New York writer Leonard Michaels, later collected in her anthology, Portraits in Print.  The anthology also contained Benedict's magazine profile of Nobel laureate Joseph Brodsky, Bernard Malamud and Paule Marshall.

In 1981, Benedict moved to New York, where she freelanced for five years, publishing short stories and articles in literary journals, magazines and newspapers. She began teaching at Columbia University's Graduate School of Journalism in 1986, where she is now a full-time professor.

Benedict's works have been translated and published in Italy, the Netherlands, Greece, Germany, the Czech Republic, Hungary and Portugal. She has received fellowships from the Freedom Forum, MacDowell, Palazzo Rinaldi in Italy, The Ragdale Foundation, The Tyrone Guthrie Centre in Ireland, the Virginia Center for the Creative Arts, Ucross, I-Park and Yaddo.

Themes
Benedict's novels explore the themes of war, trauma, displacement, isolation, racism and sexism, often through the eyes of people who fall outside the predominant culture. She has written of Middle Eastern and African refugees in her forthcoming novel, "The Good Deed," and Iraqi refugees and war veterans in her recent novels "Wolf Season" and Sand Queen. "Sand Queen" was the first American literary novel about a female soldier serving in the Iraq War. Other subjects she has covered include: Dominican American immigrants, Greek peasants, mixed-race teenagers, former convicts and the descendants of slaves. Many of these themes are evident in her novel, The Edge of Eden, which is set in 1960 in the colonial islands of Seychelles.

Benedict's most recent and seventh novel, "Wolf Season, was published in 2017 by Bellevue Literary Press http://blpress.org/books/wolf-season/, won a starred review from The Library Journal (https://drive.google.com/file/d/0B5eBdZAYH6uyMjhIWU4tTUhyM3ZXdlllVW9nVmdWdGR5NHVz/view) and was listed as an editors recommended read by The Military Times, Literary Hub, Columbia Magazine, BookBrowse and elsewhere.(http://blpress.org/books/wolf-season/)  Its predecessor, the novel, Sand Queen, was published in 2011 by Soho Press and in paperback in July 2012. The Boston Globe praised the novel, calling it "'The Things They Carried for women in Iraq". Robert Olen Butler wrote on its cover, "Every war eventually yields works of art which transcend politics and history and illuminate our shared humanity. Helen Benedict's brilliant new novel has done just that with this century's American war in Iraq. SAND QUEEN is an important book by one our finest literary artists."  Wisconsin Public Radio's To The Best of Our Knowledge featured an interview with Benedict about Sand Queen, calling it one of "this year's best new novels about war."

The material for "Wolf Season" and Sand Queen came from Benedict's research for her 2009  nonfiction book, The Lonely Soldier: The Private War of Women in Iraq. In The Lonely Soldier, Benedict describes the experiences of female troops fighting in the Iraq War and their abuse at the hands of their male comrades. The Lonely Soldier received the Ken Book Award in 2009.

Benedict's writings on women at war inspired the award-winning 2012 documentary, The Invisible War, and an ongoing lawsuit against the Pentagon on behalf of service members who were sexually assaulted in the military.

Benedict's nonfiction books have concentrated on refugees and the field of sexual assault and abuse of women. Her most influential nonfiction books to date have been The Lonely Soldier (Beacon Press, 2009) and Virgin or Vamp: How The Press Covers Sex Crimes, (Oxford University Press, 1992).

A play Benedict wrote based on her interviews with women soldiers, The Lonely Soldier Monologues, was also produced in 2009, at two New York theaters, The Theater for the New City and La Mama Experimental Theatre Club, where it was reviewed by The New York Times. An article Benedict wrote on the same subject, "The Private War of Women Soldiers, " won the James Aronson Award for Social Justice Journalism in 2008.  In 2010, her article "The Scandal of Military Rape" won the EMMA Award for Exceptional Magazine Story.

For her writings on soldiers and war, Benedict was the 2013 Ida B. Wells Award for Bravery in Journalism and was named one of the 21 Leaders of the 21st Century by Women's E-News.

Published works

Fiction
""Wolf Season"" (2017)
Sand Queen (2011)
The Edge of Eden (2009)
The Opposite of Love (2007)
The Sailor's Wife (2000)
Bad Angel (1997)
A World Like This (1990)

Non fiction
  Map of Hope and Sorrow: Stories of Refugees Trapped in Greece, co-authored with Eyad Awwadawnan (2022)
The Lonely Soldier: The Private War of Women Serving in Iraq (2009)
Recovery: How to Survive Sexual Assault (1994)
Virgin or Vamp: How the Press Covers Sex Crimes (1992)
Portraits in Print (1991)
Safe, Strong, and Streetwise (1987)

Selected articles
"Drowning in the Garden of Eden," Washington Post, November 22, 2009
"The Plight of Women Soldiers," The Nation, May 5, 2009
"Women at War Face Sexual Violence," BBC News, April 17, 2009
"When Johnny Comes Marching In," The New York Times, April 10, 2009
"Betrayal in the Field," Columbia Magazine, Spring 2009.
"How to Lie with Statistics," Huffington Post, March 20, 2009
"Violent Veterans: The Big Picture," Huffington Post, January 14, 2009
"The Scandal of Military Rape," Ms.  Magazine fall, 2008
"Why Soldiers Rape," In These Times, August 13, 2008.
"For Women Warriors, Deep Wounds, Little Care," The New York Times  Op-Ed, May 26, 2008
"The Private War of Women Soldiers," Salon, March 3, 2007

Selected anthologies
Foreword in Powder:  Writing by Women in the Ranks (2008)
"Women at War" in War Is (2008)
"Fiction vs. Nonfiction" in The Practical Writer (2004)
"The Language of Rape" in  Transforming a Rape Culture (1993, 2004)
Afterword to Villette, by Charlotte Brontë, Signet Classic (2004)
"Literary Journalism and the Media" in  The Encyclopedia of International Media & Communications (2003)

References

External links
Helen Benedict's website

American women novelists
Living people
Columbia University Graduate School of Journalism faculty
American journalism academics
American women journalists
20th-century American novelists
21st-century American novelists
20th-century British women writers
21st-century American women writers
Writers from London
American expatriates in Mauritius
American expatriates in Seychelles
Novelists from New York (state)
20th-century American non-fiction writers
21st-century American non-fiction writers
Year of birth missing (living people)
20th-century American women writers